After the End is a studio album by Tampa, Florida group Merchandise, released on the 4AD label in 2014. It was the band's first album on a major record label, and marked the beginning of, in the group's words, "a new band with basically the same name."

Year-end lists

Track listing

Charts

References 

2014 albums
4AD albums